Nicolas Reid (born 4 September 1995) is an Australian rules footballer who played for the West Coast Eagles in the Australian Football League (AFL). He was recruited by  through the 2020 Pre-season supplemental selection period.

Early football
Reid played junior football for Claremont. He then decided to not continue onto professional football and played amateur football for his local side, North Beach Football Club. After kicking 48 goals in the 2018 season, he was selected to play for the  reserves team in the Western Australian Football League (WAFL). In the 2019 WAFL season, he kicked 23 goals over the 15 games he played.

AFL career
Reid was recruited by West Coast with during the 2020 pre-season supplemental selection period.
Reid debuted in West Coast's 32 point win over Hawthorn in the 12th round of the 2020 AFL season. On debut, Reid kicked 1 goal and 1 behind, and collected 9 disposals and 3 tackles. Reid was delisted at the conclusion of the season after spending only the 2020 season with the Eagles

Statistics
Statistics are correct to the 2020 season

|- style="background:#EAEAEA"
| scope="row" text-align:center | 2020
| 
| 36 || 3 || 1 || 1 || 8 || 13 || 21 || 1 || 8 || 0.3 || 0.3 || 2.7 || 4.3 || 7.0 || 0.3 || 2.7
|- style="background:#EAEAEA; font-weight:bold; width:2em"
| scope="row" text-align:center class="sortbottom" colspan=3 | Career
| 3
| 1
| 1
| 8
| 13
| 21
| 1
| 8
| 0.3
| 0.3
| 2.7
| 4.3
| 7.0
| 0.3
| 2.7
|}

Personal life
Before Reid turned to professional football, he was a Health & Physical Education teacher at Carine Senior High School.

References

External links

1995 births
Living people
West Coast Eagles players
West Coast Eagles (WAFL) players
Australian rules footballers from Western Australia